Judge Peer Lorenzen is a section president of the European Court of Human Rights. He was born in Denmark in 1944, and studied at Aarhus University. From 1995 to 1999 he was a member of the European Commission of Human Rights, and was appointed a judge in the ECHR on 1 November 1998.

References 

1944 births
Living people
Judges of the European Court of Human Rights
Danish jurists
Members of the European Commission of Human Rights
Danish judges of international courts and tribunals